Wu Lok Chun (born 18 July 1993) is a Hong Kong professional racing cyclist. He rode at the 2015 UCI Track Cycling World Championships. He also participated at the 2014 Asian Games.

References

External links

1993 births
Living people
Hong Kong male cyclists
Place of birth missing (living people)
Cyclists at the 2014 Asian Games
Asian Games competitors for Hong Kong